Abbas Mirza Mirza Abdulrasul oghlu Sharifzadeh (22 March 1893, Shamakhi – 16 November 1938, Baku) was a Soviet Azerbaijan actor of opera, theatre, and silent film; a film director; and a film editor. He was awarded the title Honored Artist of the Azerbaijan SSR (1935).

Early life and theatre career

Abbas Mirza Sharifzadeh was born into a family of a teacher, who taught at Seyid Azim Shirvani's Usul-i Jadid school. After the 1902 Shamakhi earthquake, the family moved to Baku, where Sharifzadeh became a member of a drama club at his school.

In 1908, he started acting in serious plays, including The Imaginary Invalid. He was part of the theatre troop of the Gadzhibekov family (which included Uzeyir Hajibeyov). But he had not gained fame until a successful portrayal of Agha Mohammad Khan Qajar in Abdurrahim bey Hagverdiyev's play of the same name in 1911. Not having received any professional training in dramatic arts Sharifzadeh was remembered for his outstanding performance of primary roles in stagings of both local and Western pieces. In 1916, he starred in the play the Grief of Fakhreddin, as the lead role Fakhraddin.

Career as a film actor and director 
Sharifzadeh first appeared on screen in the 1916 Russian movie Knyaz Temir-Bulat. In 1924, he played the role of the Khan in the Azerbaijani film Baygush ("Owl"). His other notable role was in the movie Avaz-avaza ("An eye for an eye") in 1929.

Sharifzadeh directed both feature films and documentaries. The former directed by him include Bismillah ("In the Name of God", 1925), Haji Gara (1929) and Mahabbat oyunu ("The Game of Love", 1935); and the latter, Azerbaijana sayahat ("A Journey to Azerbaijan", 1924) and Shakhsei-vakhsei (1929).

Arrest and execution
On 4 December 1937, at the peak of the Great Purge, Sharifzadeh was arrested on the counts of espionage, after the performance of "Macbeth" at the Azerbaijan State Academic National Drama Theatre. The evidence used against him were his frequent visits to the Iranian consulate in Ganja in 1932. The real reason for those visits, according to his colleagues, were friendly relations between a group of stage actors, of which Sharifzadeh was part, and the Iranian consul who admired Azerbaijani theatre and would often invite them for reunions. 

His émigré brother's active role in the formation of the Azerbaijan Democratic Republic in 1918–1920 contributed to the government's will to get rid of the actor. Sharifzadeh was also accused of promoting via theatre the works of the earlier arrested poets Mikayil Mushfig and Huseyn Javid (the former would later be executed and the latter would be exiled to Siberia). On 19 October 1938 he was found guilty on all charges and executed by firing squad less than a month later. He was exonerated posthumously after Joseph Stalin's death.

Personal life
In 1919, Sharifzadeh was married to Hanifa Akchurina, and together had two sons (born 1922 and 1923). He later lived with actress Marziyya Davudova, with whom they had their daughter Firangiz Sharifova (born 1924), an actress. Their great-grandson was the winner of Eurovision 2011 Eldar Gasimov.

Filmography

As actor

As filmmaker

See also
List of People's Artists of the Azerbaijan SSR

References

Further reading

External links 

 

Azerbaijani male stage actors
Azerbaijani male film actors
Azerbaijani film directors
Azerbaijani film producers
Azerbaijani film editors
1893 births
1938 deaths
People from Shamakhi
Great Purge victims from Azerbaijan
Soviet rehabilitations
20th-century Azerbaijani male actors
Honored Artists of the Azerbaijan SSR
People's Artists of the Azerbaijan SSR